The Footballer's Wife  is novel written by Kerry Katona. It is a follow up from her first novel Tough Love. It was released 3 April 2008. Originally called Rough Justice, Ebury made a last minute change of name to The Footballer's Wife, for undisclosed reasons.

Plot

The story picks up where Tough Love left off. This time it's all about Charley. She has it all now that she is officially a WAG. All the most glamorous parties, her husbands credit card and a million-pound penthouse. But behinds closed doors her life isn't as glossy as it seems. Joel Brady, her husband has a temper and beats Charley when they argue. She has to go, but there's one problem - she still loves him. Will she regret marrying in haste - and against her and her family's will?

Critical reception
Heat magazine said of Katona:"If Jackie Collins had grown up on the Shameless estate, this is pretty much what we think she'd come up with... compulsive".

References

External links
 Official Website

2008 British novels
Ebury Publishing books